Nhu Xuan is a district (huyện) of Thanh Hóa province in the North Central Coast region of Vietnam.

As of 2018 the district had a population of 72,000. The district covers an area of 860 km². The district capital lies at Yên Cát.

References

Districts of Thanh Hóa province